Tammi Terrell (born Thomasina Winifred Montgomery; April 29, 1945 – March 16, 1970) was an American singer-songwriter, widely known as a star singer for Motown Records during the 1960s, notably for a series of duets with singer Marvin Gaye.

Terrell's career began as a teenager, first recording for Scepter/Wand Records, before spending nearly nine months as a member of James Brown's Revue, recording for Brown's Try Me label. After a period attending college, Terrell recorded briefly for Checker Records, before signing with Motown in 1965. With Gaye, Terrell scored seven Top 40 singles on the Billboard Hot 100, including "Ain't No Mountain High Enough", which was inducted into the Grammy Hall of Fame in 1999, "Ain't Nothing Like the Real Thing" and "You're All I Need to Get By". Terrell's career was interrupted when she collapsed into Gaye's arms as the two performed at a concert at Hampden–Sydney College on October 14, 1967, with Terrell later being diagnosed with a brain tumor. She had eight unsuccessful surgeries before dying of the illness on March 16, 1970, at the age of 24.

Early life
Terrell was born as Thomasina Winifred Montgomery in Philadelphia, to Jennie (née Graham) and Thomas Montgomery. Jennie was an actress and Thomas was a barbershop owner and local politician. According to her sister, their mother was "mentally ill."

Terrell was the older of two siblings. According to the Unsung documentary, her sister Ludie said her parents thought Terrell would be a boy and therefore she would be named after her father. However, when she was born, the parents settled on the name Thomasina, nicknaming her "Tommie." She later changed it to "Tammy" after seeing the film, Tammy and the Bachelor, and hearing its theme song, "Tammy", at the age of 12.

According to Ludie's book, My Sister Tommie – The Real Tammi Terrell, Terrell was raped by three boys at the age of 11. Around this time, she started to have migraine headaches. While it was not thought to be of significance at the time, family members would subsequently state that these headaches might have been related to her later diagnosis of brain cancer.

Terrell attended Germantown High School in Philadelphia.

Career

Early recordings
In 1960, Terrell signed under the Wand subsidiary of Scepter Records after being discovered by Luther Dixon, recording the ballad "If You See Bill" under the name Tammy Montgomery and doing demos for The Shirelles. After another single, Terrell left the label and, having been introduced to James Brown, signed a contract with him and began singing backup for his Revue concert tours. In 1961, Terrell created the group The Sherrys. However, in late 1962, she was kicked out of the group, due to multiple disputes. Eventually, they both went their separate ways, with The Sherrys moving on without her. In 1963, she recorded the song "I Cried". Released on Brown's Try Me Records, it became her first charting single, reaching No. 99 on the Billboard Hot 100.

After this tenure ended, Terrell signed with Checker Records and released the Bert Berns-produced "If I Would Marry You", a duet with Jimmy Radcliffe, which Terrell co-composed. Following this relative failure, Terrell announced a semi-retirement from the music business and enrolled in the University of Pennsylvania where she majored in pre-med, staying at the school for two years. In the middle of this, Terrell was asked by Jerry Butler to sing with him in a series of shows in nightclubs. After an arrangement was made by Butler to assure Terrell that she could continue her schooling, she began touring with Butler. In April 1965, during a performance at the Twenty Grand Club in Detroit, she was spotted by Motown CEO Berry Gordy, who promised to sign her to Motown. Terrell agreed and signed with the label on April 29, her 20th birthday.

"I Can't Believe You Love Me" became Terrell's first R&B top 40 single, followed almost immediately by "Come On and See Me". In 1966, Terrell recorded two future classics, Stevie Wonder's "All I Do (Is Think About You)" and The Isley Brothers' "This Old Heart of Mine (Is Weak for You)". After the release of her first single on Motown, Terrell joined the Motortown Revue opening for The Temptations.

Success with Marvin Gaye

In early 1967, Motown hired Terrell to sing duets with Marvin Gaye, who had achieved duet success with Mary Wells and Kim Weston as well as having recorded duets with Oma Heard. During recording sessions, Gaye would recall later that he did not know how gifted Terrell was until they began singing together. At first the duets were recorded separately. For sessions of their first recording, the Ashford & Simpson composition "Ain't No Mountain High Enough", both Gaye and Terrell recorded separate versions. Motown remixed the vocals and edited out the background vocals, giving just Gaye and Terrell vocal dominance. The song became a crossover pop hit in the spring of 1967, reaching No. 19 on the Billboard Hot 100 and No. 3 on the R&B charts and making Terrell a star. Their follow-up, "Your Precious Love", became an even bigger hit, reaching No. 5 on the pop chart and No. 2 on the R&B chart. At the end of the year, the duo scored another top-ten single with "If I Could Build My Whole World Around You", which peaked at No. 10 on the pop chart and No. 2 on the R&B chart. The song's B-side, the Marvin Gaye composition "If This World Were Mine", became a modest hit on both charts (No. 68 pop, No. 27 R&B). Gaye would later cite the song as "one of Tammi's favorites". All four songs were included on Gaye and Terrell's first duet album, United, released in the late summer of 1967. Throughout that year, Gaye and Terrell began performing together and Terrell became a vocal and performance inspiration for the shy and laid-back Gaye, who hated live performing. The duo also performed together on television shows to their hits. They were voted the No. 1 R&B duo in Cash Box magazine's Annual Year-End Survey in 1970.

Cancer diagnosis
While Terrell was finally being established as a star, the migraines and headaches she had suffered from childhood were becoming more constant. While she complained of pains, she insisted to people close to her that she was well enough to perform. However, on October 14, 1967, while performing "Your Precious Love" with Gaye at Hampden–Sydney College, just outside the town of Farmville, Virginia, Terrell collapsed into Gaye's arms onstage. Shortly after returning from Virginia, doctors diagnosed a malignant tumor on the right side of her brain. She underwent brain surgery at Graduate Hospital in Philadelphia on January 13, 1968.

After recovering from her first surgery, Terrell returned to Hitsville studios in Detroit and recorded "You're All I Need to Get By". Both that song and "Ain't Nothing Like the Real Thing" reached No. 1 on the R&B charts. Despite Terrell's optimism, her tumor worsened, requiring more surgeries. By 1969, Terrell had retired from live performances as she had been ordered by doctors not to perform due to her tumors. Motown issued Terrell's first and only solo album, Irresistible, in early 1969. Terrell was too ill to promote the recordings. There was no new repertoire on the album: all tracks had been recorded earlier and subsequently shelved for some time.

Both Marvin Gaye and Valerie Simpson gave different stories on how the production of Terrell's and Gaye's third album together, Easy, went about. According to reports, Terrell had become so ill as a result of her operations that she could not record, and Motown opted to have Valerie Simpson sub in for Terrell, a report that was repeated in the book Marvin Gaye: What's Going On and the Last Days of the Motown Sound. Gaye would later say the move was "another moneymaking scheme on BG's [Berry Gordy's] part". Valerie Simpson, on the other hand, stated that the ailing Terrell was brought into the studio when she was strong enough to record over Simpson's guide vocals, insisting Terrell had sung on the album. Easy produced the singles "Good Lovin' Ain't Easy to Come By", "What You Gave Me", "California Soul" and the UK top-10 hit "The Onion Song". Late in 1969, Terrell made her final public appearance at the Apollo Theater, where Marvin Gaye was performing. As soon as Gaye spotted Terrell, he rushed to her side and the duo began singing "You're All I Need to Get By" together. They were given a standing ovation by the public.

Personal life 

In 1962, 17-year-old Terrell became involved in an abusive relationship with James Brown, who was 12 years her senior. One night on the road in 1963, Terrell left Brown after he assaulted her for not watching his entire performance. Bobby Bennett, former member of the Famous Flames, witnessed the incident. "He beat Tammi Terrell terrible. She was bleeding, shedding blood. Tammi left him because she didn't want her butt whipped," said Bennett.

During the Motortown Revue in 1966, Terrell embarked on a torrid romance with The Temptations lead singer David Ruffin. That year, Terrell accepted Ruffin's surprise marriage proposal. After Terrell announced their engagement onstage during an appearance together, she discovered that he was already married. Ruffin had a wife, three children, and another girlfriend in Detroit. This revelation and Ruffin's drug addiction led to violent arguments. Terrell told Ebony magazine in 1969 that she believed her emotional state during this relationship was a contributing factor to her headaches, which would come after quarrels. In 1967, Terrell ended their relationship after Ruffin hit her in the head with his motorcycle helmet. It was rumored that Ruffin also hit Terrell in the head with a hammer, which further complicated her unknown condition. However, this rumor was dispelled in Terrell's Unsung episode.

At the time of Terrell's death, she was engaged to Ernest "Ernie" Garrett. He was a doctor at the hospital where she had been treated.

Death
Because of ongoing complications due to brain cancer, by early 1970, Terrell was using a wheelchair, experienced blindness and hair loss, and weighed only . Following her eighth and final operation on January 21, 1970, Terrell went into a coma. She died on March 16 at the age of 24. Terrell's funeral was held at the Janes Methodist Church in Philadelphia. She was interred at Mount Lawn Cemetery in Sharon Hill, Pennsylvania. At the funeral, Gaye delivered a final eulogy while "You're All I Need to Get By" was playing. According to Terrell's fiancé Dr. Ernest "Ernie" Garrett, who knew Gaye, her mother angrily barred everyone at Motown from her funeral, except for Gaye, whom she felt was Terrell's closest friend. She blamed most of the label from failing to protect her from David Ruffin during their relationship.

Gaye never fully got over Terrell's death, according to several biographers who have stated that Terrell's death led Gaye to depression and drug abuse. In addition, Gaye's classic album What's Going On, an introspective, low-key work that dealt with mature themes, released in 1971, was in part a reaction to Terrell's death.

Awards and nominations 
Terrell and Marvin Gaye were nominated for Best Rhythm & Blues Group Performance, Vocal or Instrumental for their song "Ain't No Mountain High Enough" at the 10th Annual Grammy Awards in 1968. The song was later inducted into the Grammy Hall of Fame in 1999.

Discography

Studio albums

 Side A is by Terrell, side B is by Jackson

Compilation albums

Singles

 Credited to Tammy Montgomery.

See also
 List of notable brain tumor patients

Notes

References

Further reading
 Ritz, David. Divided Soul: the Life of Marvin Gaye (2003 edition)
 Whitall, Susan. For the Record: Women of Motown (1998)

External links
 [ Tammi Terrell] at Allmusic
 
 

1945 births
1970 deaths
20th-century American singers
20th-century American women singers
African-American women singers
American soul singers
American women pop singers
Burials in Pennsylvania
Checker Records artists
Deaths from brain cancer in the United States
Deaths from cancer in Pennsylvania
James Brown vocalists
Marvin Gaye
Motown artists
Musicians from Philadelphia
Scepter Records artists
Singers from Pennsylvania
Wand Records artists